María Teresa Ortuño Gurza (born 16 June 1957) is a Mexican politician affiliated with the PAN. As of 2013 she served as Senator of the LX and LXI Legislatures of the Mexican Congress representing the Federal District. She also served as Deputy during the 1982–1985 and 1988–1992 periods.

References

1957 births
Living people
Politicians from Torreón
Women members of the Senate of the Republic (Mexico)
Members of the Senate of the Republic (Mexico)
Members of the Chamber of Deputies (Mexico)
National Action Party (Mexico) politicians
21st-century Mexican politicians
21st-century Mexican women politicians
Women members of the Chamber of Deputies (Mexico)
20th-century Mexican politicians
20th-century Mexican women politicians
Autonomous University of Coahuila alumni
Members of the Congress of Chihuahua